Alcibiades or Alkibiades may refer to:

In ancient Greece
 Alcibiades (c. 450–404 BC), a prominent Athenian statesman, orator, and general
 Alcibiades (character), appearing in several Socratic dialogues
 First Alcibiades, a dialogue attributed to Plato
 Second Alcibiades, a dialogue attributed to Plato
 Alcibiades, the name of other members of the Alcmaeonidae family

Other people
 Alcibiades of Apamea (fl. 230 AD), a Jewish Christian Elchesaite
 Albert Alcibiades, Margrave of Brandenburg-Kulmbach (1522–1557)
 Andreas Alcibiades (born 1991), a Cypriot soccer player
 Alcibíades Arosemena Quinzada (1883–1958), a Panamanian politician
 Alcibíades Colón Inoa (1919 – 2016), a Dominican Republic baseball player
 Alcibiades DeBlanc (1821–1883), an American lawyer
 Alcibiades Diamandi (1893–1948), an Aromanian political figure of Greece
 Alcibiades González Delvalle (born 1936), a Paraguayan writer
 Alcibiades Hidalgo (born 1946), Cuban politician and defector to the United States
 Alcibíades Rojas McRay (born 1986), a Panamanian footballer
 Alcibíades Vicencio (1860–1913), a Chilean obstetrician gynecologist and Scout
 Alkibiades Zickle, a pen-name of Willy Wiedmann (1929–2013)

Other uses
 Alcibiades (horse) (1927–1957), racehorse
 Alcibiades Stakes, a horse race run annually in Lexington, Kentucky, U.S.
 Alcibiades the Schoolboy (1652), an Italian satirical defence of homosexuality in dialogue form

See also

Alcibiade (disambiguation)